The 18th Strategic Aerospace Division is an inactive United States Air Force unit. Its last assignment was with the Fifteenth Air Force at Fairchild Air Force Base, Washington, where it was inactivated on 2 July 1968.

History
The 18th Composite Wing served as part of the defense force for the Hawaiian Islands from 1 May 1931 – 29 January 1942. It inactivated after suffering disastrous losses in the Japanese attack on Pearl Harbor (7 December 1941).

From June 1942 until 1944, it operated as the 18th Replacement Wing, processing personnel entering Second Air Force.

Redesignated as the 18th Air Division on 1 July 1959, it assured that assigned wings were organized, manned, trained, and equipped to conduct long-range bombardment operations using either nuclear or conventional weapons.

The division was redesignated as 18 Strategic Aerospace Division on 15 February 1962, and also developed and maintained a strategic missile operational capability. Between 1965 and 1968, subordinate units of the 18th loaned aircraft and aircrews to SAC organizations for combat during the Vietnam War.

The division was inactivated on 2 July 1968 due to budget constraints.

Lineage
 Established as the 18th Composite Wing on 8 May 1929
 Activated on 1 May 1931
 Redesignated 18th Wing on 1 September 1937
 Redesignated 18th Bombardment Wing on 19 October 1940
 Inactivated on 29 January 1942
 Redesignated 18th Replacement Wing on 17 June 1942
 Activated on 23 June 1942
 Disestablished on 11 April 1944
 Reestablished and redesignated 18th Air Division on 20 May 1959
 Activated on 1 July 1959
 Redesignated 18th Strategic Aerospace Division on 15 February 1962
 Discontinued and inactivated on 2 July 1968

Assignments
 Hawaiian Department, 1 May 1931
 Hawaiian Air Force, 1 November 1940 – 29 January 1942
 Second Air Force, 23 June 1942 – 11 April 1944
 Fifteenth Air Force, 1 July 1959 – 2 July 1968

Components
Wings
 6th Strategic Wing: 25 March 1967 – 2 July 1968
 91st Bombardment Wing: 1 July 1963 – 1 September 1964
 92d Bombardment Wing (later 92 Strategic Aerospace Wing): 1 July 1959 – 2 July 1968
 320th Bombardment Wing: 1 July 1965 – 2 July 1966
 341st Strategic Missile Wing: 2 July 1966 – 2 July 1968
 462d Strategic Aerospace Wing: 1 February 1963 – 25 June 1966
 4157th Strategic Wing: 1 July 1965 – 25 March 1967
 4158th Strategic Wing: 1 July 1965 – 25 June 1966
 4170th Strategic Wing: 1 July 1959 – 1 February 1963

Groups
 5th Composite Group (later, 5 Bombardment Group): 1 May 1931 – 29 January 1942
 11th Bombardment Group: 1 February 1940 – 29 January 1942
 18th Pursuit Group: 1 May 1931 – 1 November 1940

Stations
 Fort Shafter, Hawaii, 1 May 1931
 Hickam Field, Hawaii Territory, 30 October 1937 – 29 January 1942
 Salt Lake City, Utah, 23 June 1942 – 11 April 1944
 Fairchild Air Force Base, Washington, 1 July 1959 – 2 July 1968

Campaigns

See also
 List of United States Air Force air divisions

References

Notes

Bibliography

 
 

018
018
Military units and formations established in 1929
1931 establishments in Hawaii
1944 disestablishments in Utah
1959 establishments in Washington (state)
1968 disestablishments in Washington (state)